The Yellowhead Highway is a major interprovincial highway in Western Canada that runs from Winnipeg to Graham Island off the coast of British Columbia via Saskatoon and Edmonton.  It stretches across the four western Canadian provinces of British Columbia, Alberta, Saskatchewan, and Manitoba and is part of the Trans-Canada Highway system and the larger National Highway System, but should not be confused with the more southerly, originally-designated Trans-Canada Highway. The highway was officially opened in 1970. Beginning in 1990, the green and white Trans-Canada logo was used to designate the roadway.

The highway is named for the Yellowhead Pass, the route chosen to cross the Canadian Rockies.  The pass and the highway are named after a fur trader and explorer named Pierre Bostonais.  He had yellow streaks in his hair, and was nicknamed "Tête Jaune" (Yellowhead).  Almost the entire length of the highway is numbered as 16, except for the section in Manitoba that is concurrent with Trans-Canada Highway 1.

The highway number "16" is also the number given to a branch of the Trans-Canada in New Brunswick; Route 16. However, the numeric designation is strictly coincidental, and New Brunswick Route 16 is not part of the Yellowhead.

Route description

British Columbia and Alberta

It then connects via a  ferry route to Prince Rupert, then passes southeastward for  through to Prince George, before travelling another  eastward through to Tête Jaune Cache.

A spur of the Yellowhead Highway, Highway 5, also known as the Southern Yellowhead Highway, connects the main highway at Tête Jaune Cache midway between the Alberta-British Columbia border and Prince George. The highway continues past Kamloops before following the Coquihalla Highway to Hope. Unlike Highway 16, route 5 is not branded as being part of the Trans-Canada system and retains the original Yellowhead signage (whereas Highway 16 uses the Trans-Canada Highway logo).

The highway enters Alberta through the Rocky Mountains near Jasper,  from Tête Jaune Cache, passes through Edmonton  further east, and travels another  before entering Saskatchewan at Lloydminster.

Saskatchewan and Manitoba

Within Manitoba, the highway travels  before meeting the main Trans-Canada Highway near Portage la Prairie, Manitoba, where it ends its Highway 16 designation. It then overlaps the TCH into Winnipeg as an unnumbered highway. Officially, the eastern end of the Yellowhead Highway is at the corner of Portage Avenue and Main Street in Winnipeg.

History
The main Yellowhead Highway has been designated as Highway 16 for its entire length since 1977. Prior to this, only the Alberta and British Columbia portions of the highway were designated with this number. From the Manitoba border to Saskatoon, the highway was designated as Highway 14 while the portion from Saskatoon to Lloydminster and the Alberta border was designated as Highway 5. Prior to the opening of the Yellowhead Highway, Highways 5 and 14 both ran the width of Saskatchewan; the respective eastern and western portions of these highways retain their original designations. Prior to the highway retaining the number 16 designation, a very small section of the highway along Idylwyld Drive in Saskatoon was not designated with a number, as Highway 14 redirected on to 22 Street and Highway 5 would redirect on to Idylwyld Drive from 23 Street. Currently, the Yellowhead Highway remains unnumbered between Winnipeg and PTH 16, although it shares the roadway with PTH 1.

While the beginnings of the Yellowhead highway can be traced back to 1819 when Iroquois Metis Pierre Bostonais, nicknamed Tête Jaune/Yellow Head, was engaged by the Hudson Bay Trading Company to guide them westward through the Rocky Mountains, the impetus for the building of the highway began in 1921 when a group from Edmonton formed to advocate for a drive-able road from Edmonton to Jasper/ Tête Jaune.
In 1936 the advocacy was formalized with the formation of the Yellowhead Highway Association which later, in 1947, was reformed as the Trans-Canada Highway System Association and a submission was made to Prime Minister Mackenzie King to advocate for the construction of the highway.  The Association was renamed the Trans Canada Yellowhead Highway Association (TCYHA) in 2000 to better reflect its roots. The iconic Yellowhead Highway signage seen along the highways is trademarked to the TCYHA.
The Yellowhead Highway was officially opened in Western Canada in 1970; in 1978 all four Western Provinces agreed to use #16 for the highway. In 1986, the Yellowhead highway received the designation of a Trans Canada Highway with Highway #5 in BC, from Tête Jaune to Hope, remaining named just the Yellowhead Highway. 

The Highway 5 in British Columbia used to be designated as part of the Yellowhead Highway only between Tête Jaune Cache and Kamloops, with Highway 5 south of Kamloops being signed with the standard BC highway shield.  In the 2000s, route markers along the Coquihalla Highway were changed to reflect Yellowhead Highway 5.

See also
Trans-Canada Highway
Numbered highways in Canada
Highway of Tears murders

References

External links

Trans-Canada Yellowhead Highway Association
www.milepost.com